Love & Hip Hop: Miami is the fourth installment of the Love & Hip Hop reality television franchise. It premiered on January 1, 2018 on VH1 and chronicles the lives of several people in the Miami area who are involved with hip hop music.

Series overview

Episodes

Season 1 (2018)

Season 2 (2019)

Season 3 (2020)

Season 4 (2021–22)

Ratings

References

External links

Love & Hip Hop
Lists of American reality television series episodes